Gurjar Veer is a 1932 silent film by director Dhirubhai Desai. The movie was released under Sharda film co. and Mehta luhar productions in India. The  photography director for the movie was Chaturbhai Patel. The film starred Yashvant Dave, Chandrika, Bhim and Himatlal.

See also
History of film

References

External links
 
 Gujjar veer link on citwf

Gurjar
1932 films
Indian silent films
Indian black-and-white films
Films directed by Dhirubhai Desai